Jonna Mendez (née Hiestand; born 1945) is an American former technical operations officer, photo operations officer, and chief of disguise in the Central Intelligence Agency's (CIA) Office of Technical Service.

Life and career 
Jonna Hiestand was born in 1945 in Campbellsville, Kentucky. In 1963, she graduated from high school in Wichita, Kansas and went on to attend college at Wichita State. After graduation, she worked for Chase Manhattan Bank in Frankfurt. In 1966, she was recruited by the CIA in Europe and started a career with them.

In the CIA, Mendez lived under cover and served tours of duty in Europe, the Far East, the Subcontinent, and at CIA Headquarters. In the 1970's, she joined the Office of Technical Service and worked overseas with a speciality in clandestine photography.
As a technical operations officer, Mendez also prepared the CIA's most highly placed foreign assets in the use of spy cameras and the processing of intelligence gathered by them. In this role, she also developed creative photography skills. In 1982, she was one of the few selected for a year-long leadership development program. At the program's completion, she was given a choice among some assignments and became a generalist in disguise, identity transformation, and clandestine imaging in South and Southeast Asia.

She was assigned to Denied Area Operations for disguise in 1986. This took her to the most difficult and hostile operating areas in the world where she and her colleagues matched wits with the overwhelming forces of the KGB in Moscow, the Stasi in East Germany and the Cuban DGI. In 1988, she was promoted to Deputy Chief of the Disguise Division and in 1991, Chief of Disguise. During her tenure as Chief of Disguise, she met with President George H.W. Bush in a mask disguise, which she removed in the meeting to demonstrate the effectiveness of the art of disguise. In 1993, she retired and was awarded the CIA's Commendation Medal.

Jonna Hiestand Goeser met her future second husband, Tony Mendez, also a CIA officer, while assigned to Bangkok. Following Mendez's retirement in 1990, they married in 1991. They had a son together.

Later years
After retiring from the CIA in 1993, Mendez and her husband served on the board of directors for the International Spy Museum in Washington, D.C. They were both involved in the museum planning and design.

Works 
 Co-author Tony Mendez, Bruce Henderson; Spy Dust: Two Masters of Disguise Reveal the Tools and Operations that Helped Win the Cold War New York: Atria Books, 2003. , 
 Co-author Antonio J Mendez; The Moscow Rules: the secret CIA tactics that helped America win the Cold War, New York: PublicAffairs, 2019. , 
 In a 2015 lecture, Jonna Mendez explained how Czechoslovakian husband and wife KGB spies Karl Koecher and Hana Koecher used sex to infiltrate the CIA and gather top-secret information. One popular Washington, D.C., “swinger’s club” frequented by the couple counted at least 10 CIA staffers and a United States senator as members.

References

External links 
 Official website
 "Former CIA Chief of Disguise Breaks Down Cold War Spy Gadgets," in WIRED (video).
 The life-and-death theater of espionage Jonna Mendez at TEDxBermuda (October 2019)
 
 "Mother, Daughter, Sister, Spy" (video of panel discussion about women in the intelligence community). Washington, DC: International Spy Museum, January 6, 2017.

People of the Central Intelligence Agency
Special effects people
Living people
20th-century American women
21st-century American women writers
People from Campbellsville, Kentucky
Wichita State University alumni
Writers from Kentucky
1945 births
21st-century American biographers
20th-century United States government officials